Thomas Charles Colyear, 4th Earl of Portmore (27 March 1772 – 18 January 1835), styled Viscount Milsington from 1785 until 1823, was a British landowner and politician.

Early life
Lord Portmore was the son of William Colyear, 3rd Earl of Portmore and Lady Mary Leslie (1753–1799), second daughter of the 10th Earl of Rothes.

Career
Lord Milsington was an English amateur cricketer who made three known appearances in first-class cricket matches from 1792 to 1793. He was mainly associated with Hampshire and was an early member of Marylebone Cricket Club.

Political career
Lord Portmore was a Member of Parliament (MP) for the borough of Boston in Lincolnshire from 1796 to 1802.

He succeeded to his father's titles upon his death in 1823.

Personal life
He was married twice; in 1793 he married Lady Mary Elizabeth Bertie (d. 1797), daughter of Brownlow Bertie, 5th Duke of Ancaster and Kesteven, by whom he had a son:
Hon. Brownlow Charles Colyear, inherited the personal property of the Duke of Ancaster on his death in 1809, but died in Rome in 1819 due to injuries sustained in a fight with bandits.

In 1828 Lord Portmore married Frances Murrells.

His titles became extinct on his death on 18 January 1835. The estates passed to his cousin James Dawkins (1760–1843), who had also been an MP.

Arms

References

External sources
 CricketArchive record
 

1772 births
1835 deaths
Milsington, Charles Colyear, Viscount
Earls of Portmore
Milsington, Charles Colyear, Viscount
Milsington, Charles Colyear, Viscount
Milsington, Charles Colyear, Viscount
UK MPs who inherited peerages
English cricketers
English cricketers of 1787 to 1825
Hampshire cricketers
British people of Scottish descent
Marylebone Cricket Club cricketers